Ctenanthe oppenheimiana, the giant bamburanta or never-never plant, is a species of flowering plant of family Marantaceae and is a native of Brazil. It is an evergreen perennial. The leaves are adorned on the secondary veins with dark green bands, which meet and merge in the margins. In between are cream coloured bands. The undersides of the leaves have a red-ish colour. The cultivar ‘Tricolor’ is a common ornamental variety, which as a houseplant in the UK has gained the Royal Horticultural Society’s Award of Garden Merit. (confirmed 2017). This cultivar is visually very similar to Stromanthe Sanguinea 'Triostar', and the two are often confused. The difference between the two lies in the lack of regular banding on the leaves of the Sromanthe, and the generally more rounded shape of the leaves in Ctenanthe.

Synonyms
 Calathea oppenheimiana E.Morren
 Maranta herderiana Regel
 Maranta oppenheimiana (E.Morren) Petersen
 Phyllodes oppenheimiana (E.Morren) Kuntze

References

House plants
Marantaceae
Flora of Brazil
Garden plants